Chyliza is a genus of rust flies (insects in the family Psilidae).

Species 

 Chyliza abstrusa
 Chyliza acromelaena
 Chyliza acuta
 Chyliza amaranthi
 Chyliza amnoni
 Chyliza angrensis
 Chyliza angustifrons
 Chyliza annulipes
 Chyliza apicalis
 Chyliza benoiti
 Chyliza bigoti
 Chyliza breviceps
 Chyliza calcaria
 Chyliza calidella
 Chyliza callosa
 Chyliza caudata
 Chyliza chikuni
 Chyliza compedita
 Chyliza connectens
 Chyliza consanguinea
 Chyliza coxachaeta
 Chyliza crinita
 Chyliza crusculata
 Chyliza cryptica
 Chyliza cylindrica
 Chyliza dichaeta
 Chyliza elegans Hendel, 1913
 Chyliza emotoi
 Chyliza enthea
 Chyliza eoa
 Chyliza erudita Melander, 1920
 Chyliza extenuata
 Chyliza flavifrons
 Chyliza fraterna
 Chyliza freyi
 Chyliza fumipennis
 Chyliza fuscicornis
 Chyliza gracilis
 Chyliza hackarsi
 Chyliza himalayana
 Chyliza humeralis
 Chyliza inermipes
 Chyliza ingetiseta
 Chyliza inopinata
 Chyliza javana
 Chyliza kaplanae
 Chyliza kivuensis
 Chyliza kunashirica
 Chyliza lampra
 Chyliza latifrons
 Chyliza leae
 Chyliza leguminicola
 Chyliza leptogaster
 Chyliza limpidipennis
 Chyliza macropyga
 Chyliza maculifrons
 Chyliza maculipleura
 Chyliza melanica
 Chyliza metallica
 Chyliza monika
 Chyliza munda
 Chyliza nakanishii
 Chyliza nartschukiae
 Chyliza nepalensis
 Chyliza nigriapex
 Chyliza nigrifemorata
 Chyliza nigrigenu
 Chyliza nigronitens
 Chyliza nigroviridis
 Chyliza nobilis
 Chyliza notata
 Chyliza nova
 Chyliza nyamuragirae
 Chyliza ocellaris
 Chyliza oreophila
 Chyliza orientalis
 Chyliza overlaeti
 Chyliza palpibasis
 Chyliza panfilovi
 Chyliza pictipennis
 Chyliza prominens
 Chyliza pseudomunda
 Chyliza pumila
 Chyliza pygmaea
 Chyliza richteriae
 Chyliza robusta
 Chyliza rubronigra
 Chyliza rufivertex
 Chyliza rwindiensis
 Chyliza saegeri
 Chyliza sasophila
 Chyliza sauteri
 Chyliza scrobiculata
 Chyliza selecta
 Chyliza selectoides
 Chyliza semiornata
 Chyliza sepsoides
 Chyliza sergii
 Chyliza seseroensis
 Chyliza similis
 Chyliza splendida
 Chyliza stigmatica
 Chyliza straeleni
 Chyliza surcularia
 Chyliza takagii
 Chyliza tenuis
 Chyliza tibialis
 Chyliza trichopoda
 Chyliza trilineata
 Chyliza tristis
 Chyliza uncinula
 Chyliza varipes
 Chyliza vittata
 Chyliza wittei
 Chyliza zangana
 Chyliza zhelochovtsevi

References

External links 
 

 

Psilidae
Schizophora genera